Platypedia putnami is a species of cicada in the family Cicadidae. It is found in North America.

Subspecies
These four subspecies belong to the species Platypedia putnami:
 Platypedia putnami keddiensis Davis, 1920
 Platypedia putnami lutea Davis, 1920
 Platypedia putnami occidentalis Davis, 1920
 Platypedia putnami putnami (Uhler, 1877)

References

Further reading

External links

 

Articles created by Qbugbot
Insects described in 1877
Platypediini